Iwan Axwijk (born 3 May 1983 in Amsterdam, Netherlands) is a Dutch footballer who played for Eerste Divisie club HFC Haarlem during the 2004–2008 seasons.

Club career
Axwijk left the FC Utrecht youth setup in 2004 to play 4 years professionally for Haarlem in the Eerste Divisie. In summer 2008 he joined amateur side FC Lisse and later played for IJsselmeervogels and Sparta Nijkerk before returning to childhood club Hellas Sport.

International career
Axwijk played once for the Netherlands national under-19 football team, in 2001 against Italy.

Personal life
His brother Lion Axwijk played professional football for RKC Waalwijk, SC Veendam and AGOVV.

References

External links
voetbal international profile

1983 births
Living people
Footballers from Amsterdam
Association football midfielders
Dutch footballers
Netherlands youth international footballers
HFC Haarlem players
FC Lisse players
IJsselmeervogels players
Eerste Divisie players
Sparta Nijkerk players